The 2013 Copa ASOBAL was the 24th edition of the Copa ASOBAL. It took place in the Palau Blaugrana, in Barcelona, Catalonia, on 21 & 22 December 2013. The tournament was hosted by FC Barcelona and Barcelona city council, being the second time Barcelona hosts Copa ASOBAL.

FC Barcelona won its overall ninth title, third in a row and qualified for 2014–15 EHF Champions League.

Qualified teams
Qualified teams are the top four teams on standings at midseason (matchday 15).

Venue

Matches

Semifinals

Final

TV coverage
The tournament was broadcast in Catalonia in Esport3 and nationwide at Spain in Sportmanía. Also worldwide via LAOLA1.tv

Top goalscorers

See also
Liga ASOBAL 2013–14
Copa del Rey de Balonmano 2013–14

References

External links
Official website

2013–14 in Spanish handball
Copa ASOBAL